Barejadi is a village in Ahmedabad district in the Indian state of Gujarat.

Demographics
 India census, Barejadi had a population of 1,602. Males constitute 50.37% of the population and females 49.63%. Barejadi has an average literacy rate of 81.91%: male literacy is 89.30%, and female literacy is 74.42%. In Barejadi, 13.05% of the population is under 6 years of age.

Transport

Railway
Barejadi Nandej railway station is located on the Western Railway Ahmedabad – Vadodara Segment. It is 17 km Ahmedabad, 82 km from Vadodara.

References

Villages in Ahmedabad district
Settlements in Gujarat